Margaret Wangari Muriuki (born 21 March 1986) is a Kenyan professional long and middle distance runner. She shared in the team gold medal at the 2010 IAAF World Cross Country Championships. Individually, she won medals at the African Cross Country Championships and the African Championships in Athletics (1500 m) in 2012.

She initially started out as a 1500 metres runner and came seventh in that event at the 2007 All-Africa Games. She was the winner of the 2008 Cross de Atapuerca and went on to finish in eighth place at the IAAF World Cross Country Championships that year. She won the 2009 Lotto Cross Cup de Hannut cross country race in 2009.

Muriuki placed sixth at the 2010 IAAF World Cross Country Championships, which helped the Kenyan women to the world team title. She was the runner-up at the 2012 African Cross Country Championships behind teammate Joyce Chepkirui, both of whom shared the team title. A week later she took third place at the Lisbon Half Marathon, finishing behind Diana Chepkemoi. Showing her versatility, she went back down to the 1500 m at the 2012 African Championships in Athletics and won the bronze medal for Kenya in a personal best of 4:06.50 min. She ran on the American road circuit in August and won both the Beach to Beacon 10K and the Falmouth Road Race. She was runner-up at that year's Portugal Half Marathon (also held in Lisbon).

Muriuki secured the Kenyan national title in cross country at the start of 2013, guaranteeing selection for the 2013 IAAF World Cross Country Championships.

In 2020, amid scares of the disease COVID-19 spreading in California, Muriuki ran a dominant race in the Los Angeles Marathon, crossing the finish with a 3-minute lead in a time of 2:29:27.

Competition record

Personal bests
1500 metres - 4:06.50 min (2012)
3000 metres - 8:37.97 min (2010)
5000 metres - 14:40.48 min (2013)
10K (road) - 31:05 min (2010)
Half marathon - 69:21 min (2012)

References

External links

1986 births
Living people
Kenyan female middle-distance runners
Kenyan female long-distance runners
People from Nakuru County
Athletes (track and field) at the 2014 Commonwealth Games
Kenyan female cross country runners
Commonwealth Games competitors for Kenya
Athletes (track and field) at the 2007 All-Africa Games
African Games competitors for Kenya
20th-century Kenyan women
21st-century Kenyan women
Commonwealth Games medallists in athletics
Commonwealth Games silver medallists for Kenya
Athletes (track and field) at the 2022 Commonwealth Games
Medallists at the 2022 Commonwealth Games